Bolesław Witczak (born 8 March 1966 in Szamotuły) is a politician, engineer of logistics, entrepreneur.

In 1981 he graduated from Trade School and then in 1988 became alumnus of Wood Technology School in Poznań. In the years 2002–2004 he studied at logistics faculty of High School of Communication and Management in Poznań.
In the years 2001–2005 he studied at the logistics faculty of High School of Communication and Management in Poznań. Promoter of graduate diploma entitled "Theory of Constraints (TOC) as logistical strategy in management on purchasing department of productive enterprise" was Professor Marek Fertsch.
In 2002 he attended the course “Theory of Constraints” in production and logistics areas organized by Abraham Y. Goldratt Institute/Velocity Management Group.
In 1992 he established the section of Real Politics Union (Unia Polityki Realnej) in Szamotuły.
On 5 November 2007 he became a president of Wielkopolska Region of Real Politics Union and from 2 June 2008 also runs the leadership of Podkarpacie Region of UPR.

Bolesław Witczak took part in parliament election from Janusz Korwin-Mikke's Platform list in (as UPR member) 2005.

In the election 2007 he was a candidate to Parliament from the League of Polish Families list (as UPR member) in Piła district.

On 7 June 2008 he was appointed a chairman of Real Politics Union.

9 January 2010 conventicles elected as President of the UPR Magdalena Kocik, but in September the same year the National Court decided the choice to be invalid, leaving Boleslaw Witczak on the record as president of the UPR.

In local elections in 2010 as member of UPR was a candidate for council of Wielkopolska (the list has not received credentials).

On 19 February 2011, during the convention and conventicles of UPR convened by Bolesław Witczak and Magdalena Kocik, elected the new president of the party Bartosz Józwiak.

Witczak is married since 1996 and has two sons: Antoni and Jan.

References

External links

1966 births
Living people
People from Szamotuły
Polish Roman Catholics
Real Politics Union politicians